The Georgetown Raiders were an ice hockey team from Georgetown, Ontario, Canada. They competed in the OHA Senior A and Intermediate A ranks in the 1970s and 1980s.

The Raiders won the W.G. Hardy Trophy, also known as the Hardy Cup, as the Canadian Intermediate A champions in 1982. They are not known to be connected to another Georgetown Raiders team which is currently a member of the Ontario Provincial Junior A Hockey League.

History
Georgetown was an entry in the Niagara District Intermediate A Hockey League, which folded in 1979. Georgetown was one of two teams from that loop (the Dundas Merchants were the other) to be accepted into the Georgian Bay Intermediate A league, with which the Niagara league had played an interlocking schedule. The league changed its name to the Major Intermediate A Hockey League in 1980.

The Raiders played four years in the Georgian Bay/Major league and finished in first place three times. They also advanced to the playoff final in all four seasons, losing to Dundas in 1980, beating the Owen Sound Greys in 1981, defeating the Collingwood Shipbuilders in 1982 and losing to Collingwood in 1983.

In 1982, the Raiders became the first OHA team to ever win the Hardy Cup. Only two Ontario teams ever one it, the other being the Dundas Real McCoys in 1986. The Hardy Cup was the Senior "AA"/Intermediate "A" National Championship.

The Major Intermediate A league folded in 1983. Georgetown was one of three teams accepted into the OHA Senior A league. Its fate after this point is not known.

Season-by-season results

References

External links 

 Georgetown Raiders memorabilia from The Georgetown Vault

Senior ice hockey teams
Ice hockey teams in Ontario
Defunct ice hockey teams in Canada
Halton Hills
1953 establishments in Ontario
1986 disestablishments in Ontario
Ice hockey clubs established in 1953
Sports clubs disestablished in 1986